Donald John Knight (12 May 1894 – 5 January 1960) was an amateur cricketer who played first-class cricket for Surrey, Oxford University and England between 1911 and 1937.

A stylish opening batsman, Knight first played for Surrey in 1911 while he was still a schoolboy at Malvern College, and won a Blue while studying at Trinity College, Oxford, either side of the First World War. He was a Wisden Cricketer of the Year in 1915. His great season was 1919 when, after completing his university studies, he opened regularly for Surrey with Jack Hobbs and scored 1,588 runs at an average of more than 45 runs per innings, with seven centuries. That season, R. C. Robertson-Glasgow wrote, "people went to The Oval to see Hobbs and Knight open the Surrey innings. Many then did not know, or care to ask, which was which, satisfied to watch the joint approach to perfection."

In a county match at Hastings in 1920, Knight was struck on the head while fielding and was never quite the same batsman again. In 1921 he was picked for two Test matches against the all-conquering Australians but scored only 54 runs in four innings. In the First Test his 38 in the second innings was England's highest score in the match.

He became a teacher at Westminster School, where he was master in charge of cricket for many years. After the 1921 season he appeared only occasionally for Surrey, mostly in the summer holidays, retiring after playing 12 games in 1937.

References

External links
 
 Donald Knight at CricketArchive

1894 births
1960 deaths
People educated at Malvern College
Alumni of Trinity College, Oxford
English cricketers
England Test cricketers
Surrey cricketers
Oxford University cricketers
Wisden Cricketers of the Year
Free Foresters cricketers
Marylebone Cricket Club cricketers
Gentlemen cricketers
North v South cricketers
Harlequins cricketers
Gentlemen of England cricketers
English cricketers of 1919 to 1945
C. I. Thornton's XI cricketers
L. G. Robinson's XI cricketers
English schoolteachers